Tomas Carl Olof Kronstål (born 1967) is a Swedish politician and member of the Riksdag, the national legislature. A member of the Social Democratic Party, he has represented Kalmar County since September 2018.

Kronstål is the son of property manager Carl Kronståhl and May-Britt Kronståhl (née Oskarsson). He is a painter and has run his own business since 1992. He is also a part-time fireman. He has been a member of the municipal council in Västervik Municipality since 2006.

References

1967 births
Living people
Members of the Riksdag 2018–2022
Members of the Riksdag 2022–2026
Members of the Riksdag from the Social Democrats
People from Västervik Municipality